The 16th Asian Cross Country Championships took place on 7 March 2023 in Kathmandu, Nepal. The venue was Gokarna Forest Resort in Kathmandu.

Participating Nations

Medallist

Senior 
10 km

Junior 
8 km

6 km

Medal Table 

 Bronze medal in 6 km Girls' team was not awarded due to lack of participants

References 

Sport in Kathmandu
Asian Cross Country Championships
Asian Cross Country
Cross Country
Asian Cross Country Championships
Asian Cross Country Championships